Vice-Admiral William Waldegrave, 8th Earl Waldegrave, CB (27 October 1788 – 24 October 1859) was a British naval commander and politician.

Waldegrave was the son of George Waldegrave, 4th Earl Waldegrave and his wife, the former Lady 
Elizabeth Laura Waldegrave. His parents were first cousins. He was educated at Eton. In 1802, he became a Midshipman in the Royal Navy, rising to the ranks of Lieutenant in 1806 and Commander in 1809. He fought during the War of 1812, commanding frigate HMS Macedonian (which was later captured by the United States).

On his return to England, he married Elizabeth Whitbread, the daughter of Samuel Whitbread and took over from his father-in-law's post as Member of Parliament (MP) for Bedford in 1815.

Leaving that post in 1818, Waldegrave then commanded HMS Seringapatam from 1829 to 1832 and HMS Revenge from 1839 to 1842 and was created a Companion of the Order of the Bath in 1840.

He retired from the navy in 1846 as a Rear-Admiral, inherited his childless nephew's titles in 1846 and was married for a second time that year, to Sarah Milward, née Whitear. He was promoted to Vice-Admiral in 1858 and died a year later, three days before his seventy-first birthday. His eldest son, William Waldegrave, Viscount Chewton had died in 1854 and he was succeeded by his grandson, William.

Citations

References

External links
 

1788 births
1859 deaths
People from Mendip District
People educated at Eton College
Members of the Parliament of the United Kingdom for English constituencies
Earls Waldegrave
Royal Navy vice admirals
William Waldegrave, 8th Earl Waldegrave
UK MPs 1812–1818
UK MPs who inherited peerages